Gareth Chirawu (born 23 February 2001) is a Zimbabwean cricketer. He made his first-class debut on 9 December 2020, for Mashonaland Eagles, in the 2020–21 Logan Cup. Prior to his first-class debut, he was named in Zimbabwe's squad for the 2020 Under-19 Cricket World Cup. He made his Twenty20 debut on 16 April 2021, for Eagles, in the final of the 2020–21 Zimbabwe Domestic Twenty20 Competition. He made his List A debut on 18 April 2021, for Eagles, in the 2020–21 Pro50 Championship.

References

External links
 

2001 births
Living people
Zimbabwean cricketers
Mashonaland Eagles cricketers
Place of birth missing (living people)